The 2012 Southland Conference men's basketball tournament, a part of the 2011–12 NCAA Division I men's basketball season, took place March 7, 8 and 10, 2012 at the Merrell Center in Katy, Texas The winner of the tournament received the Southland Conference's automatic bid to the 2012 NCAA Tournament.

Format
Tournament seeding, 1 through 8, was based upon regular-season winning percentage regardless of divisional place in Conference competition.  The quarterfinals were broadcast online by the Conference's Internet streamer, SLC Now. The semi-finals were broadcast regionally on SLC TV and nationally on ESPN3 while the championship game was broadcast nationally on ESPN2 and ESPN3.

Bracket

Game Summaries

External links
2012 Southland Basketball Tournament website

Southland Conference men's basketball tournament
Tournament
Southland Conference men's basketball tournament
Southland Conference men's basketball tournament
Sports competitions in Katy, Texas
College basketball tournaments in Texas